Gentil dos Santos (born 19 May 1899, date of death unknown) was a Portuguese sprinter. He competed in the men's 100 metres and the 200 metres events at the 1924 Summer Olympics.

References

External links
 

1899 births
Year of death unknown
Athletes (track and field) at the 1924 Summer Olympics
Portuguese male sprinters
Olympic athletes of Portugal